Baboushka and The Three Kings is a children's picture book written by Ruth Robbins, illustrated by Nicolas Sidjakov, and published by Parnassus Press in 1960. Sidjakov won the annual Caldecott Medal as illustrator of the year's "most distinguished American picture book for children".

About
Parnassus was a small press in Berkeley, California, established in 1957 by Herman Schein, the husband of writer-illustrator Ruth Robbins. Sidjakov illustrated one of its first books and during the next several years it published at least three picture books he created with Robbins  as writer.

Plot
Baboushka and the Three Kings retells a "Russian folktale about an old woman's endless search for the Christ child". In a retrospective essay about the Caldecott Medal-winning books from 1956 to 1965, Norma R. Fryatt wrote, "Children will find in it something unusual, perhaps too removed from their experience and the Christmas story as they know it, but certainly it is a book to which they should be introduced... Primitive colors, rigid vertical lines, stylized figures, an unusual typeface that satisfied both artist and designer, – this combination of graphic skills was an experiment and one which in the main succeeded."

Song
The 28-page book includes a song "Baboushka," verse by Edith M. Thomas and musical score by Mary Clement Sanks.

References

External links

 Parnassus Press at the Internet Speculative Fiction Database
 

American picture books
Caldecott Medal–winning works
1960 children's books
Children's fiction books
Christmas children's books